The Feast of the Innocents is a 2003 English-language novel written by award-winning Filipino author Azucena Grajo Uranza.  Set during the Philippines' post-People Power period, Feast of the Innocents is chronologically the fourth part of Uranza’s literary saga, after the Women of Tammuz.

References

Philippine novels
2003 novels
Novels set in the Philippines